The 1874 Vermont gubernatorial election took place on September 1, 1874. Incumbent Republican Julius Converse, per the "Mountain Rule", did not run for re-election to a second term as Governor of Vermont. Republican candidate Asahel Peck defeated Democratic candidate W.H.H. Bingham to succeed him.

Results

References

Vermont
1874
Gubernatorial
September 1874 events